Armando Cipriano Zamorano Flores (born 3 October 1993) is a Mexican professional footballer who plays as a midfielder.

International
Armando was part of the Mexico U-17 team to win the under-17 World Cup at home soil for the first time in the tournament history. He would soon become a regular player for Mexico being called up for different youth tournament for different category such as with Mexico U-20 and now with the under-21.

Honours
Morelia
Copa MX: Apertura 2013
Supercopa MX: 2014

Querétaro
Copa MX: Apertura 2016

Mexico Youth
FIFA U-17 World Cup: 2011
CONCACAF U-20 Championship: 2013
Central American and Caribbean Games: 2014

References

External links

1993 births
Living people
People from Autlán, Jalisco
Footballers from Jalisco
Mexico under-20 international footballers
Atlético Morelia players
Chiapas F.C. footballers
Querétaro F.C. footballers
Cimarrones de Sonora players
Cafetaleros de Chiapas footballers
Liga MX players
Ascenso MX players
Association football midfielders
Mexican footballers
Central American and Caribbean Games gold medalists for Mexico
Central American and Caribbean Games medalists in football
Competitors at the 2014 Central American and Caribbean Games